Marek Havlík (born 8 July 1995) is a professional Czech football midfielder currently playing for 1. FC Slovácko.

Career statistics

International

References
 
 

Czech footballers
1995 births
Living people
Czech First League players
1. FC Slovácko players
Association football midfielders
Czech Republic international footballers
Czech Republic under-21 international footballers
Czech Republic youth international footballers